Pretty Bob Creek is a stream in eastern Henry County in the U.S. state of Missouri. It is a tributary to the South Grand River within Truman Reservoir.

Pretty Bob Creek has the name of Bob "Pretty Bob" Lawler.

See also
List of rivers of Missouri

References

Rivers of Henry County, Missouri
Rivers of Missouri